Karachuonyo Constituency is an electoral constituency in Kenya. It is one of eight constituencies in Homa Bay County. The current member of parliament is Hon. Andrew Adipo Okuome. Karachuonyo constituency is in history for having its first Member of parliament to be elected as an independent candidate in 1963, Hon. Elijah Omollo Agar.

Members of Parliament

Wards

References

External links 
Karachuonyo Constituency

Constituencies in Homa Bay County
Constituencies in Nyanza Province